St. Marys Cemetery is a cemetery located in St. Marys, Ontario. It is most notable for being the burial place of Canadian Prime Minister Arthur Meighen (1874–1960).  Opened in 1885 to relieve the full Protestant Cemetery, it is the resting place for Protestants in the area. A few plots were relocated to this cemetery from the old, which has since become a park.

Other notables buried here:
 George Graham, victim of the  disaster in 1912
 James Brine of the Tolpuddle Martyrs

References

Further reading
 Jennifer McKendry (2003). Into the silent land : historic cemeteries & graveyards in Ontario, Kingston, Ont.,

External links
 Town of St. Marys: St. Marys Cemetery

Cemeteries in Ontario
Protestant Reformed cemeteries